Downstairs may refer to:
 Downstairs (EP), an independent release by the band 311
 Downstairs (film), a 1932 film starring John Gilbert
 The Downstairs Club (later Le Disque a Go! Go!)

See also
Downstair
Upstairs (disambiguation)